Mount Washu or Washū-zan is a 133 meter hill in Shimotsui (下津井), Kurashiki, Japan, but famous traditionally for viewing the Seto Inland Sea dotted with various small islands, and now for commanding the majestic view of the Great Seto Bridge, one of the three bridges connecting Shikoku Island with the main Honshu Island.

On the hill are the visitor center and two observation points. Near the parking lot, now free, stands the stele of a local haiku poet's kyoka, "Shima hitotsu miyage ni hoshii Washū-zan", which means: Mount Washu is the only precious souvenir that I want to bring back home from this trip.

Transportation
Mount Washu can be reached in fifteen minutes by car from Kojima Station of JR's Honshi-Bisan Line or in ten minutes from Kojima Interchange (:ja:児島インターチェンジ) of Seto-Chūō Expressway.

See also
Seto Inland Sea
Kurashiki

References

External links

Tourist attractions in Okayama Prefecture
Seto Inland Sea